Finger Lakes Regional Airport  is a public-use airport located  Southeast of Seneca Falls, a town in Seneca County, New York, United States. It is owned by the government of Seneca County. This airport is included in the FAA's National Plan of Integrated Airport Systems for 2009–2013, which categorized it as a general aviation facility.

Facilities and aircraft 
It has two runway with asphalt and turf surfaces: 1/19 is 4,952 by 75 feet (1,509 x 23 m); 11/29 is 1,850 by 70 feet (564 x 21 m).

References

External links 
  airport diagram from New York State DOT
 

Airports in New York (state)
Transportation buildings and structures in Seneca County, New York
Airports established in 1943
1943 establishments in New York (state)